Hydnellum mirabile is an inedible species of tooth fungus in the family Bankeraceae. It is found in Europe and North America, where it grows on the ground in forested areas. Caps are brownish to dark brown with yellow edges, and have a hairy surface. On the cap underside (the hymenium) hang brownish spines with paler tips. The spores are roughly spherical with tubercles on the surface, and measure 5–7 by 4.5–6 µm.

See also
List of fungi by conservation status

References

Fungi described in 1863
Fungi of Europe
Fungi of North America
Inedible fungi
Taxa named by Elias Magnus Fries